Walter Baele (born 16 May 1964 in Waregem) is a Flemish cabaretier and actor, best known for creating characters.

Television acts 
 Marcel de Neudt in Familie Backeljau
 Jacky Lebot in U Hoort Nog Van Ons
 Rosa Vermeulen in Rosa
 Wito, de reggaeman in Dilemma
 As newsreporter in Brussel Nieuwsstraat
 André van Superette André in Brussel Nieuwsstraat.
 The man from Zwijnaarde
 Eugène Van Leemhuyzen in Samson en Gert
 Jürgen van Moerseek, the homosexual musical wonder
 Serafino De Sluwe in Mega Mindy
 Prins Filip in Wij van België

Theater
 Als... (1986) selected for the Camerettenfestival and the Wim Sonneveldprijs.
 De Frits Fricket show (1991–1992) winner of Humorologieprijs in Marke.
 Wie heeft Martin en Yourki gezien? (1993–1994)
 Martha (1994–1995)
 Waarom rudy? Waarom? (1997–1998)
 Wortels (1999) Later it became a play.
 Alle 10 goed (2003–2004)
 Veel tralala (2005–2006)
 Janssen in the musical Kuifje (2007)
 Lars, Goeroe, Ayoub, tv host en burgerlijk ingenieur in Baas boven baas (Kiekeboe) (2007)
  vRRiesman (2009–2010)
 Sir Lancelot in the musical Spamalot (2011)

Family 
Walter Baele is married to photographer Pascale Van den Broek. He has one child.

References

External links
 Walter Baele :: 1001 gezichten, personal website

1964 births
Living people
Flemish cabaret
Flemish male film actors
Flemish male stage actors
Flemish male television actors
People from Waregem